The iMac G5 is an all-in-one personal computer that was designed, manufactured and sold by Apple Computer from August 2004 to March 2006. It is the final iMac to use a PowerPC processor, making it the last model that could natively run Mac OS 9 (Classic) applications. It was replaced in January 2006 by the Intel-based iMac, which retained the features, price, and case design of the iMac G5.

History 

In August 2004, the iMac design was overhauled. By this time, the PowerPC 970 (G5) processor had been released and was being used in the Power Mac G5. Famously, the Power Mac G5 needed multiple fans in a large casing (or else liquid cooling, an innovative solution Apple adopted for the highest-end Power Mac G5s) because of the high heat output from those CPUs.

Apple's new iMac managed to incorporate the PowerPC 970 into an all-in-one design with a distinctive form factor. The computer used the same 17 and 20-inch widescreen LCDs found in the iMac G4, with the main logic board and optical drive now mounted directly behind the LCD panel; this gave the appearance of a thickened desktop LCD monitor. The approximately two inches deep enclosure is suspended above the desk by an aluminum arm that can be replaced by a VESA mounting plate. The iMac G5 uses an advanced cooling system controlled by the operating system; at low CPU loads this rendered the iMac G5 virtually silent. Apple boasted that it was the slimmest desktop computer on the market.

The iMac G5 was updated in March 2005 to the Ambient Light Sensor (ALS) revision. It included a handful of configuration differences – more RAM, a larger hard drive, improved graphics, Gigabit Ethernet, and standard AirPort Extreme (802.11g) and Bluetooth 2.0+EDR.

In October 2005, the final revision was released, adding an integrated iSight webcam mounted above the LCD and Apple's Front Row media interface. Other improvements included faster processors, more RAM, larger hard drives, and improved graphics. Notably this became the first Apple computer to use the PCI Express expansion bus and DDR2 SDRAM, with these features appearing shortly before they were incorporated into the Power Mac G5. It was declared "The Gold Standard of desktop PCs" by Walt Mossberg of The Wall Street Journal.

Although the iMac G5 iSight looked outwardly similar to the two previous revisions, it had a slimmer, internally new design. Improvements included superior cooling and performance increases. The stand could no longer be replaced with a VESA mount. This case, unlike the previous models, opened only from the front and requires the LCD screen to be removed before internal components can be accessed. Apple recommend no user serviceable items other than RAM, which is accessible through a small door at the base of the housing. In the intervening years, many guides have been posted on the internet to support replacing other components including the hard drive and optical drive, though doing would have at one time voided any remaining Apple warranty.

The iMac G5 was succeeded by the Intel-based iMac on January 10, 2006, beginning the 6-month transition of Apple's entire line of computers to the Intel architecture.

Specifications

Timeline of iMac models

References 

G5
PowerPC Macintosh computers
Macintosh all-in-ones
Computer-related introductions in 2004